is a railway station on the Shinano Railway Line in the town of Sakaki, Nagano, Japan, operated by the third-sector railway operating company Shinano Railway.

Lines
Tekuno-Sakaki Station is served by the Shinano Railway Line and is 47.9 km (29.76 miles) from the starting point of the line at Karuizawa Station.

Station layout
The station consists of two ground-level opposed side platforms serving two tracks, connected to the station building by a footbridge.

Platforms

Adjacent stations

History
The station opened on 1 April 1999.

Passenger statistics
In fiscal 2017, the station was used by an average of 455 passengers daily (boarding passengers only).

Surrounding area
Kanei-Nakanojo Industrial Park

See also
 List of railway stations in Japan

References

External links

Shinano Railway Tekuno-Sakaki Station 

Railway stations in Japan opened in 1999
Railway stations in Nagano Prefecture
Shinano Railway Line
Sakaki, Nagano